The Proofreaders' Page and Other Uncollected Items was an attempt to collect as many uncollected works by Fredric Brown as possible.

Contents 
The Proofreaders' Page (109 columns)
Let Colonel Cluck Answer Your Questions (18 columns)
Questionable Answer Dept. by Colonel Kluck (6 columns)
Fatal Facsimile (short story)
Ernie and the Rescue on the Road or the Case of the Missing Tacks (short story)
The Case of the Bargain Butter (short story)
Hot Air Rises (short story)
Beginner's Luck (short story)
Mr. Bopper and the Radio (short story)
A Mistaken Maxim (poem)
Banana Oil! (poem)
Chaucer Up-to-Date: The Flapper (poem)
A Musical Innovation (poem)
Chivalry (poem)
Retrospect (poem)
Tummy Trouble (poem)
A Kiss (poem)
At the Circus (poem)
Card System Enables Feed Dealer to Follow Up on Sales (article)
Toward a Definition of Science Fiction (editorial)
Introduction to HUMAN? (introduction)
Why I Selected-Nothing Sirius (article)
Autobiographical Sketch (article)
Wish I Had Written That (article)
Letter to John W. Campbell, Jr. (letter)
Kid's Stuff (assorted games and puzzles)
Fredric Brown's Novels and Their Magazine Versions by Jack Seabrook

References

External links

2011 short story collections
2011 short stories
Short story collections by Fredric Brown